Black River Drive is a rock band from Auckland, New Zealand. Black River Drive consists of Sam Browne (Lead Vocals, Guitar), Rusty McNaughton (Bass), Matt Stone (Piano, Synths), Mike Tan (Drums) and Davie Wong (Lead Guitar).

Black River Drive toured New Zealand extensively in 2010 and 2011, before starting to work on their second album, that was released on November, 7th, 2014.

History

Perfect Flaws 

After signing with record distributor Rhythm Method (Opshop, Fat Freddy’s Drop, Shapeshifter), Black River Drive’s debut album Perfect Flaws was released on 4 October 2010. The album was produced with Greg Haver and Chris Van De Geer. Many tracks were mixed by Tim Palmer at '62 Studios in Austin, Texas.

Special Edition 
On 3 March 2011 Black River Drive published a special edition release of the Perfect Flaws album. On the final day of recording Perfect Flaws, the band recorded some songs in a relaxed, live acoustic setting. Initially gifting some tracks to Facebook fans as mp3s, the band decided to make all five songs available in full CD quality as a limited release.

Quicksand
Black River Drive's album Quicksand was produced by Toby Wright in Nashville, had additional guitars tracked by Zorran Mendonsa in Auckland, mixing by Forrester Savell in Melbourne, and mastering by Jens Borgen Fascination Street in Sweden. This international effort has added up to one of NZ's biggest rock albums of 2014.

The album was recorded over two months in Nashville, Tennessee with US hard rock and metal producer Toby Wright, the man behind albums by the likes of Alice in Chains, Metallica, Slayer, Sevendust and Ozzy Osbourne. It was funded through a $20k crowd funding campaign and received government funding from NZOA. The album was mixed by Australian rock producer/engineer Forrester Savell (I Am Giant, Karnivool, Dead Letter Circus) and mastered at Fascination Street in Sweden.

Their new album is scheduled for release on 7 November 2014.

Discography

Albums

References

External links
 Black River Drive – Official site

New Zealand hard rock musical groups